Enchelyurus is a genus of combtooth blennies found in the Pacific and Indian Oceans.

Species
There are currently five recognized species in this genus:
 Enchelyurus ater (Günther, 1877) (Black blenny)
 Enchelyurus brunneolus (O. P. Jenkins, 1903)
 Enchelyurus flavipes W. K. H. Peters, 1868
 Enchelyurus kraussii (Klunzinger, 1871) (Krauss' blenny)
 Enchelyurus petersi (Kossmann & Räuber, 1877)

References

 
Blenniinae
Taxa named by Wilhelm Peters
Marine fish genera